"Hit 'Em wit da Hee" is a single by singer/rapper Missy "Misdemeanor" Elliott. The track is found on her debut album, 1997's Supa Dupa Fly. The single was not eligible to chart in the U.S. (because it was not commercially released there), and it was a success overseas, reaching No. 25 in the UK, her fourth consecutive top 40 hit. The music video edit of the song contains sampled strings from the Björk song "Jóga". In The U.S. the album version was released to radio and it received minor mainstream urban radio airplay and peaked at No. 61 on the U.S. Billboard Hot R&B/Hip-Hop Airplay chart. Released from Supa Dupa Fly, it was the final single from the album during summer 1998.

Music video 

The music video for this song takes place in a dark castle on a hill and it was shot on March 31, 1998. Elliott is seen in a suit dancing with other dancers. When the song changes to the "Jóga" instrumental, she is seen walking with a magic chalice and three objects floating beside her; specifically a teapot, a metal egg holder and a metal gauntlet. Cameo appearances are made by Magoo, Kelly Price, Nicole Wray, Ginuwine, Playa, Mocha, and Timbaland. The song ends with the metal horse moving rapidly almost as if Elliott had something to do with it. The remix of the song was used for the video. Instead of featuring Lil' Kim, the remix features Keli Nicole Price, Mocha and Timbaland.

Track listings

US Single 
12" Promo
Side A
"Hit 'Em Wit Da Hee" (Remix Extended Version) (featuring Lil' Kim & Mocha)
"Hit 'Em Wit Da Hee" (LP Version Clean) (featuring Lil' Kim & Mocha)
Side B
"Hit 'Em Wit Da Hee" (Remix Instrumental)
"Hit 'Em Wit Da Hee" (Remix Acapella) (featuring Lil' Kim & Mocha)

12" Single
Side A
"Hit 'Em Wit Da Hee" (Remix Extended Version) (featuring Lil' Kim & Mocha) - 4:57
Side B
"Beep Me 911" (Remix) (featuring 702 & Magoo) - 4:20
"Sock It 2 Me" (Funky DL Remix) (featuring Da Brat) - 4:30

UK Single 
CD Maxi-Single
"Hit 'Em Wit Da Hee" (LP Version) (featuring Lil' Kim & Mocha) - 4:53
"Hit 'Em Wit Da Hee" (Ganja Kru Remix) (featuring Lil' Kim & Mocha) - 6:42
"Sock It 2 Me" (Funky DL Remix) (featuring Da Brat) - 4:30

Europe Single 
12" Single
Side A
"Hit 'Em Wit Da Hee" (LP Version Dirty) (featuring Lil' Kim & Mocha) - 4:20
Side B
"Hit 'Em Wit Da Hee" (Remix Instrumental) - 4:53
"Hit 'Em Wit Da Hee" (Ganja Kru Remix) (featuring Lil' Kim & Mocha) - 6:42

Charts

References

1998 singles
Missy Elliott songs
Music videos directed by Paul Hunter (director)
Song recordings produced by Timbaland
Songs written by Missy Elliott
Songs written by Timbaland
Songs written by Björk
Songs written by Lil' Kim